Marc-Antoine-Amédée Michel, known as Marc-Michel (22 July 1812 in Marseille – 12 March 1868 in Paris) was a French poet, playwright and journalist. He is perhaps best known today for the 1851 farce he co-wrote with Eugène Marin Labiche, The Italian Straw Hat, since then adapted many times to stage and screen.

Life
He began his studies in Aix-en-Provence in 1821 at the collège Saint-Louis, run by the Jesuits.

References

External links

http://viaf.org/viaf/61566488
http://data.bnf.fr/ark:/12148/cb12057064d

Writers from Marseille
1812 births
1868 deaths
19th-century French dramatists and playwrights
19th-century French journalists
French male journalists
19th-century French poets
19th-century French male writers